Cattleya elongata, the "cattleya with the elongated stalk", is an orchid species in the genus Cattleya endemic to the campo rupestre vegetation in northeastern Brazil.

Its ploidy is 2n = 80.

Cattleya elongata forms two natural hybrids :
 Cattleya × tenuata (=  C. elongata × C. tenuis) (Brazil) .
 Cattleya × undulata ( = C. elongata × C. schilleriana) (Brazil).

References

External links 

elongata
Plants described in 1877
Orchids of Brazil